Ladd is the surname of:

Alan Ladd (1913–1964), American film actor
Alan Ladd, Jr. (1937–2022), American film industry executive and producer
Andrew Ladd (b. 1985), Canadian ice hockey player 
Aspen Ladd (b. 1995), Mixed Martial Arts fighter
Azel P. Ladd (1811–1854), American educator
Cheryl Ladd (b. 1951), American actress and singer
Diane Ladd (b. 1932), American actress
Donna Ladd (b. 1961), American journalist
Edwin F. Ladd (1859–1925), American politician
Ernie Ladd (1938–2007), American football player and wrestler
George Ladd (Medal of Honor recipient), American Civil War soldier
George Eldon Ladd (1911–1982), American minister and professor
George Trumbull Ladd (1842–1921), American philosopher and psychologist
Herbert W. Ladd (1843–1913), American politician
Helen Ladd, education economist
Jean Ladd (1923–2009), All-American Girls Professional Baseball League player
Jesse A. Ladd (1887–1957), United States military officer
Jim Ladd (b. 1948), American radio personality
Jordan Ladd (b. 1975), American actress
Joseph Onesimus Ladd (1818–1882), founder of Ladd's cordials in Adelaide, South Australia
Kate Macy Ladd (1863–1945), American philanthropist
Margaret Ladd (b. 1942), American actress
Mike Ladd, American musician
Mike Ladd (poet) (b. 1959), Australian poet
PJ Ladd (b. 1983), American skateboarder
William Ladd (1778–1841), American philanthropist and peace advocate
William S. Ladd (1826–1893), American banker and politician